Nar is a village development committee in Manang District in the Gandaki Zone of northern Nepal. In the 2011 Nepal census it had a population of 362 people, living in 86 individual households.

References

Populated places in Manang District, Nepal